James Dawson may refer to:

James Dawson (activist) (1806–1900), prominent champion of Aboriginal interests
James Dawson (footballer, born 1890) (1890–1933), Scottish football striker
James Dawson (politician) (1823–1886), Ontario political figure
James Lennox Dawson (1891–1967), Scottish recipient of the Victoria Cross
James Walker Dawson (1870–1927), Scottish pathologist
James Frederick Dawson (1874–1941), American landscape architect
Juno Dawson (James Dawson, born 1985), British author
Jerry Dawson (footballer, born 1909) (James Dawson, 1909–1977), Scottish football goalkeeper

See also
Jimmy Dawson (disambiguation)